Antony Royston Paul Barker (30 May 1947 – 20 April 2020) was a cricketer who played 27 first-class and four List A matches for Worcestershire in the late 1960s.

Barker did not enjoy particular success, reaching fifty only twice in his short career. He made 55 against Gloucestershire at Cheltenham in August 1968, and 67 almost a year later against Lancashire at Southport.

References

External links
Roy Barker from CricketArchive

1947 births
2020 deaths
English cricketers
Worcestershire cricketers
Staffordshire cricketers
Sportspeople from Newcastle-under-Lyme